James Kitchenman Coyne III (born November 17, 1946) is an American businessman and former politician. From 1981 to 1983, he served one term as a Republican member of the U.S. House of Representatives from Pennsylvania.

Biography
Coyne was born in Farmville, Virginia, and raised in Abington, Pennsylvania, the son of James Kitchenman Coyne Jr. and Pearl Beatrice Black.  He graduated from Yale University in 1968 and received an M.B.A. from Harvard Business School in 1970.  He was a lecturer at the Wharton School at the University of Pennsylvania from 1974 to 1979 and was president of the George S. Coyne Chemical Corp., Inc., from 1971 to 1981. Coyne was the supervisor of Upper Makefield Township in 1980.

Congress 
He was elected in 1980 as a Republican to the 97th Congress.  He was an unsuccessful candidate for reelection in 1982.

Later career 
After his term in Congress, he served from 1983 to 1985 as a special assistant to President Ronald Reagan and as director of the White House Office of Private Sector Initiatives, in 1985–1986 as chief executive officer of the American Consulting Engineers Council, and as president of the American Tort Reform Association from 1986 to 1988. In 1987, he founded Americans to Limit Congressional Terms.

Coyne co-authored (with John Fund) "Cleaning House," which promoted state referendums to limit the terms of Members of Congress. In 1994 he was chosen president of the National Air Transportation Association, where he served until 2012.

He married Helen Biddle Mercer on October 24, 1970.  They have three children, Alexander Black Coyne (born 1977), Katherine Mercer Coyne (born 1980) and Michael Atkinson Coyne (born 1982).  He is a great-great-grandson of Philadelphia manufacturer James Kitchenman.

Sources

External links

1946 births
Living people
Businesspeople from Pennsylvania
Harvard Business School alumni
People from Abington Township, Montgomery County, Pennsylvania
People from Bucks County, Pennsylvania
People in the chemical industry
Republican Party members of the United States House of Representatives from Pennsylvania
Yale University alumni
Members of Congress who became lobbyists